This is a list of African-American newspapers that have been published in the state of Kansas.  It includes both current and historical newspapers.  

Although abolitionist newspapers were published in Kansas as early as 1854, the first Kansas newspaper published by and for African Americans was the Colored Radical, published briefly at Lawrence and Leavenworth in 1876. With resurgent white supremacy in the South and the end of the  Reconstruction era after 1876, westward emigration of African Americans from the South increased greatly, and African-American newspapers blossomed across the state through 1920.

Newspapers

Newspapers that are currently published are highlighted in green.

See also 
List of African-American newspapers and media outlets
List of African-American newspapers in Colorado
List of African-American newspapers in Missouri
List of African-American newspapers in Nebraska
List of African-American newspapers in Oklahoma
List of newspapers in Kansas

Works cited

References 

Newspapers
Kansas
African-American
African-American newspapers